Adriatic Croatia or Littoral Croatia is one of the four NUTS-2 Regions of Croatia since 2021. The region forms the coastal part of the country. The five most populated cities in the region are Split, Rijeka, Zadar, Pula and Šibenik. It accounts for 44% of the country's territory and 33% of the population.

References

See also
 NUTS statistical regions of Croatia

Subdivisions of Croatia
NUTS 2 statistical regions of Croatia
NUTS 2 statistical regions of the European Union